Alexa Scott (born 3 April 2001) is a Canadian long track speed skater.

Career
At the 2020 World Junior Speed Skating Championships, Scott won the bronze medal in the overall event, despite suffering from food poisoning.

Scott's first senior competition came in 2020, when she won a silver in the women's team pursuit at the 2020 Four Continents Speed Skating Championships in Milwaukee, Wisconsin.

In January 2022, Scott was named to her first Olympic team, where she will contest the 1000 m and team pursuit events.

Personal records

References

2001 births
Living people
Canadian female speed skaters
Speed skaters at the 2022 Winter Olympics
Olympic speed skaters of Canada
21st-century Canadian women